Conus crotchii is a species of sea snail, a marine gastropod mollusk in the family Conidae, the cone snails and their allies.

Like all species within the genus Conus, these snails are predatory and venomous. They are capable of "stinging" humans, therefore live ones should be handled carefully or not at all.

Description
The size of the shell varies between 18 mm and 32 mm.

Distribution
This species occurs in the Atlantic Ocean off the island of Boa Vista, Cape Verde.

References

 Rolán E., 2005. Malacological Fauna From The Cape Verde Archipelago. Part 1, Polyplacophora and Gastropoda
  Puillandre N., Duda T.F., Meyer C., Olivera B.M. & Bouchet P. (2015). One, four or 100 genera? A new classification of the cone snails. Journal of Molluscan Studies. 81: 1–23 
 Cossignani T. & Fiadeiro R. (2018). Quattro nuovi coni da Capo Verde. Malacologia Mostra Mondiale. 98: 14-20.page(s): 17

External links
 The Conus Biodiversity website
 Cone Shells – Knights of the Sea
 

crotchii
Gastropods described in 1849
Gastropods of Cape Verde
Endemic fauna of Cape Verde
Fauna of Boa Vista, Cape Verde